is a single by Japanese singer Masafumi Akikawa. The lyrics are a Japanese translation of the poem, 'Do Not Stand at My Grave and Weep'. It was released on May 24, 2006. It reached number one on the weekly Oricon Singles Chart. It was the best-selling single in Japan in 2007, with 1,115,499 copies.

References 

2007 singles
2007 songs
Japanese-language songs
Masafumi Akikawa songs
Oricon Weekly number-one singles
Songs based on poems